is a squadron of the Japan Maritime Self-Defense Force based at Marine Corps Air Station Iwakuni in Yamaguchi Prefecture, Japan. It operates MCH-101 aircraft.

As of 2016 there were seven MCH-101 aircraft in service with the squadron and plans for a total of 11. There were also discussions for the purchase for over a dozen additional aircraft.

History
Two retired MH-53E helicopters of the squadron were sold to the US in 2015 for their components. The US was running short of parts for its own fleet of the aging aircraft.

Current aircraft
 AgustaWestland MCH-101 (2008–present)

Aircraft operated

 V-107 (1974-1990)
 Sikorsky MH-53E Super Stallion (1990-2017)

References

Units and formations of the Japan Maritime Self-Defense Force
Military units and formations established in 1974